The Bridgwater by-election of March 12, 1970 was the first election in the United Kingdom to be held after the voting age had been reduced from 21 to 18. The seat was held by the Conservatives on a turnout of 70.3%.

Results

References

See also 
1938 Bridgwater by-election

Bridgwater by-election
By-elections to the Parliament of the United Kingdom in Somerset constituencies
Bridgwater by-election
Bridgwater
20th century in Somerset
Bridgwater by-election